Fernando Cabrera may refer to:

 Fernando Cabrera (baseball) (born 1981), Major League Baseball pitcher
 Fernando Cabrera (writer) (born 1964), poet and professor
 Fernando Cabrera (politician) (born 1964), Democratic New York City Council member